Gustavo Fernández defeated Shingo Kunieda in the final, 4–6, 6–3, 6–2 to win the gentlemen's singles wheelchair tennis title at the 2019 Wimbledon Championships. It was his first Wimbledon singles title and fifth major singles title overall, and he became the first player to achieve the Surface Slam in wheelchair men's singles.

Stefan Olsson was the two-time defending champion, but was defeated in the semifinals by Kunieda.

Kunieda was attempting to complete the career Super Slam.

Seeds

Draw

Finals

External links
WC Men's Singles

Men's Wheelchair Singles
Wimbledon Championship by year – Wheelchair men's singles